is a 1956 black-and-white Japanese film directed by Umetsugu Inoue.

Cast 
Tatsuya Mihashi : Tadokoro Kazuma
Yumeji Tsukioka : Ikegami Ayako
Masumi Okada : Leo
Nobuo Kaneko : Takei
Toru Abe : Takasaki
Yujiro Ishihara : Matsuki

References 

Japanese black-and-white films
1956 films
Films directed by Umetsugu Inoue
Nikkatsu films
1950s Japanese films